The Aden Emergency, also known as the Radfan Uprising, was an armed rebellion by the National Liberation Front (South Yemen) (NLF) and the Front for the Liberation of Occupied South Yemen (FLOSY) against the Federation of South Arabia, a British Protectorate of the United Kingdom, which led to the proclamation of the People's Republic of South Yemen. 

Partly inspired by Gamal Abdel Nasser's pan-Arab nationalism, it began on 14 October 1963 with the throwing of a grenade at a gathering of British officials at Aden Airport. A state of emergency was then declared in the British Crown colony of Aden and its hinterland, the Aden Protectorate. The emergency escalated in 1967 and hastened the end of British rule in the territory which had begun in 1839.

Background
Aden was originally of interest to Britain as an anti-piracy station to protect shipping on the routes to British India. With the opening of the Suez Canal in 1869, it further served as a coaling station. Over the period since the annexation of Aden, the British had signed many protection treaties with the emirs of the inland to secure British rule over the area . Following the independence of India in 1947, Aden became less important to the United Kingdom.

The Emergency was precipitated in large part by a wave of Arab nationalism spreading to the Arabian Peninsula and stemming largely from the socialist and pan-Arabist doctrines of Egyptian leader Gamel Abdel Nasser. The British, French and Israeli forces that had invaded Egypt following Nasser's nationalisation of the Suez Canal in 1956 had been forced to withdraw following intervention from both the United States and the Soviet Union.

Nasser enjoyed only limited success in spreading his pan-Arabist doctrines through the Arab world, with his 1958 attempt to unify Egypt and Syria as the United Arab Republic collapsing in failure three years later. A perceived anti-colonial uprising in Aden in 1963 provided another potential opportunity for his doctrines, though it is not clear to what extent Nasser directly incited the revolt in Aden, as opposed to the Yemeni guerrilla groups drawing inspiration from Nasser's pan-Arabist ideas but acting independently themselves.

Emergency

By 1963 and in the ensuing years, anti-British guerrilla groups with varying political objectives began to coalesce into two larger, rival organisations: first the Egyptian-supported National Liberation Front (NLF) and then the Front for the Liberation of Occupied South Yemen (FLOSY), who attacked each other as well as the British.

Hostilities commence
Hostilities started on 14 December 1963, with an NLF grenade attack against British High Commissioner of Aden Sir Kennedy Trevaskis, which took place as he arrived at Khormaksar Airport to catch a London-bound flight. The grenade killed the High Commissioner's adviser and a woman, and injured fifty other people. On that day, a state of emergency was declared in Aden.

The NLF and FLOSY began a campaign against British forces in Aden, relying largely on grenade attacks. One such attack was carried out against RAF Khormaksar during a children's party, killing a girl and wounding four children.

The guerrilla attacks largely focused on killing off-duty British officers and policemen. Much of the violence was carried out in Crater, the old Arab quarter of Aden. British forces attempted to intercept weapons being smuggled into Crater by the NLF and FLOSY on the Dhala road, but their efforts met with little success. Despite taking a toll on British forces, the death toll among rebels was far higher, largely due to inter-factional fighting among different rebel groups.

In 1964 the British 24th Infantry Brigade arrived to conduct land operations. It remained in Aden and the Aden Protectorate until November 1967.

By 1965, the RAF station RAF Khormaksar was operating nine squadrons, including transport units with helicopters and a number of Hawker Hunter fighter bomber aircraft. These were called in by the army for attacks on rebel positions in which they would use 60-pound high explosive rockets and their 30 mm ADEN cannon.

Aden street riots

On 19–20 January 1967, the NLF provoked street riots in Aden. After the Aden police lost control, British High Commissioner Sir Richard Turnbull deployed British troops to crush the riots. As soon as the NLF riots were crushed, pro-FLOSY rioters took to the streets. Fighting between British forces and pro-guerrilla rioters lasted into February. British forces had opened fire 40 times, and during that period there were 60 grenade and shooting attacks against British forces, including the destruction of an Aden Airways Douglas DC-3, which was bombed in mid-air, killing all the people on board.

Arab police mutiny
The emergency was further exacerbated by the Six-Day War in June 1967. Nasser claimed that the British had helped Israel in the war, and this led to a mutiny by hundreds of soldiers in the South Arabian Federation Army on June 20th, which also spread to the Aden Armed Police. The mutineers killed 22 British soldiers and shot down a helicopter (The pilot had to abandon take off from a ledge near Crater, Aden after being hit in the knee by a bullet. The Sioux crashed and burnt out but all three occupants escaped), and as a result, Crater was occupied by rebel forces.

Concerns were heightened regarding the ability to give sufficient security to British families in the midst of the increased violence, resulting in evacuation plans for families being sped up considerably.

Battle of Crater
Following the mutiny, all British forces were withdrawn from Crater, while Royal Marines of 45 Commando took up sniping positions on the high ground and killed 10 armed Arab fighters. However, Crater remained occupied by an estimated 400 Arab fighters. NLF and FLOSY fighters then took to the streets and engaged in gun battles, while arson, looting, and murder was also common. British forces blocked off the two main entrances to Crater. They came under sniper fire from an Ottoman fort on Sira island, but the snipers were silenced by a shell from an armoured car. Order was restored in July 1967, when the 1st Argyll and Sutherland Highlanders entered Crater under the command of Lt. Col. Colin Campbell Mitchell and managed to occupy the entire district overnight with no casualties.

Withdrawal
Nevertheless, repeated guerrilla attacks by the NLF soon resumed against British forces, causing the British to leave Aden by the end of November 1967, earlier than had been planned by British Prime Minister Harold Wilson and without an agreement on the succeeding governance. Following the British departure, the NLF managed to seize power, and established the People's Republic of South Yemen.

Aftermath
British military casualties in the period 1963 to 1967 were 90 to 92 killed and 510 wounded. British civilian deaths were 17. Local government forces lost 17 killed and 58 wounded. Casualties among the rebel forces stood at 382 killed and 1,714 wounded.

British units serving in Aden, 1963–1967

Royal Air Force
 No. 8 Squadron RAF with Hunter FGA.9
 No. 21 Squadron RAF with Twin Pioneer CC.1, Dakota, Andover CC.2
 No. 26 Squadron RAF with Belvedere HC.1
 No. 37 Squadron RAF with Shackleton MR.2
 No. 43 Squadron RAF with Hunter FGA.9
 No. 78 Squadron RAF with Twin Pioneer CC.1, Wessex HC.2
 No. 84 Squadron RAF with Beverley C.1
 No. 105 Squadron RAF with Argosy C.1
 No. 208 Squadron RAF with Hunter FGA.9
 No. 233 Squadron RAF with Valetta C.1
 No. 1417 (Fighter Reconnaissance) Flight RAF with Hunter T.7 & FR.10
 RAF Police Joint Service Command
 No. 123 Signals Unit RAF
 No. 34 Squadron RAF Regiment 1965?
 No. 27 Squadron RAF Regiment 1965/66?

Royal Navy
 HMS Ashanti
 HMS Phoebe
 HMS Intrepid
 HMS Eagle
 HMS Bulwark
 HMS Albion
 HMS Minerva [ F45 ]
 HMS Centaur
 HMS Cambrian [D85]

Royal Marines
 40 Commando RM
 42 Commando RM
 45 Commando RM

British Army

 22 SAS Regiment
 Royal Armoured Corps
 10th Royal Hussars
 1st The Queen's Dragoon Guards
 4th/7th Royal Dragoon Guards
 Queen's Own Hussars
 Queen's Royal Irish Hussars
 16th/5th The Queen's Royal Lancers
 Royal Tank Regiment
1st Royal Tank Regiment
 B Sqn 5th Royal Tank Regiment
Guards Division
 1st Battalion, Coldstream Guards
 2nd Battalion, Coldstream Guards
 1st Battalion, Welsh Guards
 1st Battalion, Irish Guards
 Infantry
 1st Battalion, Royal Scots
 4th Battalion, The Buffs (Royal East Kent Regiment)
 1st Battalion, King's Own Royal Border Regiment (Various companies in support)
 1st Battalion The King's Own Scottish Borderers
 1st Battalion, Royal Irish Fusiliers B Company
 1st Battalion, Royal Sussex Regiment
 1st Battalion, Royal Northumberland Fusiliers
 Royal Anglian Regiment
 1st Battalion, Royal Anglian Regiment
 3rd Battalion, Royal Anglian Regiment
 4th Battalion, Royal Anglian Regiment (1965)
 C Company (1967)
 1st Battalion, Prince of Wales's Own Regiment of Yorkshire
 1st Battalion, Lancashire Regiment
 1st Battalion, Somerset and Cornwall Light Infantry
 1st Battalion, King's Own Yorkshire Light Infantry
 1st Battalion, Cameronians (Scottish Rifles)
 1st Battalion, Argyll and Sutherland Highlanders
 1st Battalion, Gloucestershire Regiment
 1st Battalion, The South Wales Borderers
Parachute Regiment
 1st Battalion, Parachute Regiment
 2nd Battalion, Parachute Regiment
 3rd Battalion, Parachute Regiment
 Royal Artillery
 1st Regiment Royal Horse Artillery
 3rd Regiment Royal Horse Artillery
 7th (Parachute) Regiment Royal Horse Artillery
 19th Light Regiment Royal Artillery
 47th Light Regiment Royal Artillery
 95th Commando Regiment Royal Artillery
 Royal Engineers
 10 Field Squadron (Airfields), Royal Engineers (Nov 1964 - 13 Dec 1967, last unit to leave)
 13 Field Survey Squadron Royal Engineers (15 Jan 1964 - 29 Jun 1967)
 24 Field Squadron Royal Engineers (15 Oct 1964 - 12 Jul 1965)
 30 Field Squadron Royal Engineers (Sep 1966 - Apr 1967)
 34 Independent Field Squadron Royal Engineers
 2 Troop
 39 Field Squadron Royal Engineers (Apr 1967 - Oct 1967)
 50 Field Squadron Royal Engineers (Aug 1964 - ?)
 A Troop (Sep 1967 - Nov 1967)
 60 Field Squadron Royal Engineers (Nov 1964 - Nov 1965, Mar 1967 - Oct 1967)
 73 Field Squadron Royal Engineers (1965 - 1966)
 131 Parachute Engineer Regiment (Territorial Army)
 24th Brigade Postal and Courier Communications Unit Royal Engineers (1964 - 1967)
 Royal Corps of Signals
 15 Signal Regiment Royal Corps of Signals (1965 - 1967)
 222 (AF) Squadron Air Formation Signals (1959 - 1967)
 Royal Military Police
 Royal Corps of Transport
 Royal Electrical and Mechanical Engineers
 Royal Army Medical Corps
 10 Bde. Grp. Medical Coy R.A.M.C.
 24 Field Ambulance
 Royal Army Ordnance Corps
 Royal Army Pay Corps
 Army Air Corps (United Kingdom)
 Intelligence Corps (United Kingdom)
 Royal Pioneer Corps (518 Company)
 Army Catering Corps

See also
List of modern conflicts in the Middle East

References

Bibliography

 Naumkin, Vitaly, Red Wolves of Yemen: The Struggle for Independence, 2004. Oleander Press. 
 Walker, Jonathan, Aden Insurgency: The Savage War in South Arabia 1962–67 (Hardcover)  Spellmount Staplehurst

External links
 Infantry Assistance From Outside Aden 
 www.britains-smallwars.com – "The Barren Rocks of Aden".
 Argylls in Aden http://www.argylls1945to1971.co.uk/A_and_SH_Aden1967.htm
 Foreign Office documents concerning Aden, Yemen and the Aden emergency of 1963–1967 

 
Wars involving Yemen
Wars involving the United Kingdom
History of the Royal Marines
United Kingdom–Yemen relations
20th century in the Colony of Aden
Federation of South Arabia
1960s in Asia
1960s in the British Empire
Rebellions in Yemen